Cycnidolon pulchellum is a species of beetle in the family Cerambycidae. It was described by Lameere in 1893.

References

Cycnidolon
Beetles described in 1893